Redcastle is a village in County Donegal, Ireland, located on the eastern shores of Inishowen and overlooking the wide expanse of Lough Foyle. To the south is the city of Derry and to the north lie the villages of Moville and Greencastle.

See also
 List of towns and villages in Ireland

References

Towns and villages in County Donegal